Elaine Joy Bray (22 March 1940 – 10 January 1998) was an Australian cricketer. She played five Test matches and eight One Day Internationals for the Australia national women's cricket team.

References

External links
 Elaine Bray at southernstars.org.au

1940 births
1998 deaths
Australia women Test cricketers
Australia women One Day International cricketers
Sportswomen from Victoria (Australia)
Cricketers from Melbourne
Victoria women cricketers
People from Kew, Victoria